Hyphessobrycon acaciae is a species of South American tetra fish, belonging to the family Characidae.

Description 
Hyphessobrycon acaciae has an overall butter-like color, with small brown areas. It can be distinguished from other species in the region by a dark lateral band. Other than color, this species is similar to the Buenos Aires tetra.

A paratype specimen is held by the Ichthyology Laboratory of the University of Quindío.

Range 
Hyphessobrycon acaciae lives in the South American upper Orinoco River basin in the country of Colombia.

References 

Characidae
Taxa named by Carlos A. García-Alzate
Taxa named by Cesar Román-Valencia
Taxa named by Saul Prada-Pedreros
Fish described in 2010